This is a list of yearly List of NCAA Division II independents football records.

Independents standings

References

Independents
Basketball-related lists